Hellhole Branch is a stream in the U.S. state of Georgia. It is a tributary to Wildcat
Creek.

Hellhole Branch was so named on account of rugged terrain along its course. A variant name is "Hell Hole Branch".

References

Rivers of Georgia (U.S. state)
Rivers of Rabun County, Georgia